K. Chidananda Gowda is an Indian academic who served as the Vice-Chancellor of the Kuvempu University, which is located in the state of Karnataka, India. He is also the son-in-law of the Kannada Poet, Kuvempu, after whom the Kuvempu University is named. He has published many papers, mainly in the field of pattern recognition.

Early life
Chidananda Gowda was born in the village of Chokkady, near Sullia on 15 June 1942. He completed his graduation in Engineering from the University Visvesvaraya College of Engineering at Bangalore in 1964. He continued his studies and obtained a Master's degree in Engineering from the Maharaja Sayajirao University of Baroda in 1969. He returned to Bangalore and completed his PhD from the Indian Institute of Science in 1979. He married Tarini, the second daughter of Kuvempu. He also spent two years at NASA, United States and one year at INRIA, France for conducting post-doctoral research.

Education
He earned his Bachelor of Engineering in 1964 from University Visveswaraya College of Engineering, Bangalore.
Followed by his Master of Engineering in 1969 from M.S.University of Baroda, Baroda.
He then received his Ph.D. in 1979 from Indian Institute of Science, Bangalore.

His Post-Doctoral Research has been two years with NASA, New York, USA 1981-1983 and 1 year with INRIA, Paris, FRANCE 1989-1990.

Career
Prof. Chidananda Gowda joined the Sri Jayachamarajendra College of Engineering in Mysore as a Professor in the Computer science department and later went on to head the department. He also served as the Vice Principal of the College for about 5 years and later as the Principal for about 1.5 years. He was also a visiting professor at INRIA. He was appointed as the Vice-Chancellor of the Kuvempu University of 18 January 2002, a post which he held till 19 January 2006. He has chaired technical conferences at Zurich, Paris, Tokyo and Luxembourg. He is currently a Distinguished Professor of Computer Science at the International School of Information Management, University of Mysore, Mysore. Many also refer to him as the father of Symbolic Data Analysis in the English-speaking world.

During his tenure as the Vice-Chancellor, he had to face tough situations like the allegation that the University colleges were being used as a training centre for Naxalites. He is credited to have improved the infrastructure at the University. He also was responsible for starting new departments of business administration, microbiology, biochemistry in the University. The distance education program saw a significant growth in his tenure.

He has also authored books in Kannada and English. Some of his Kannada books include Engineering Geetegalu (Engineering Songs - 1980), Putaanigala Vignyana Padyagalu (Poems on Science for kids - 1984) and Samparka Madhyamagalu (Communication media - 1999).

Contributions to Karnataka and Kannada

Books in Kannada on Science and Technology
Putanigala Vignana Padyagalu (Poems in Kannada based on Science for children), Received Karnataka Sahitya Award(1986)
Engineering Gethegalu
 Vijnana Vachanagalu
Pattedari Padyagalu
Tantrajna Tripadigalu
Baduku-Belaku-Chutuku-Vol.1, & Vol.2
Computer (Introductory book in Kannada)
Samparka Madhyamagalu ( Book on Electronic Communication in Kannada)

Kannada Software Development
	Chief Adviser, Development of Kannada Software  “Kuvempu Kannada Tantramsha” of Kannada University, Hampi, 2007
Chairman, Kannada Software Development Committee

Editor of Kannada Dictionary and Achchagannada Kavya
Accha Kannada Nudikosha (2014)
 Samagra Achagannad kavya (2014)

President, Prathama Kannada Ganaka Sammelana
	First President of Kannada Computer Conference organized by Kannada Sahitya Parishat, and Ganaka Parishat in Bangalore  on 19,20, August, 2006.

New Initiatives at University Level in Karnataka
As Vice-Chancellor of Kuvempu University, initiated the following:
Choice Based Credit System (CBCS) at Post-graduate Level.
 Semester System at Under-graduate Level.

Positions held - earlier
Vice-Chancellor, Kuvempu University (18-1-2002 to 18-1-2006)
Member, Board of Governors, I.I.T. Bombay(April 2002 to March 2005)
AICTE Emeritus Professor of Computer Science
Member of the Syndicate, Jadavpur University, Calcutta (2000-2002)
Dean of Engineering, Mysore University : 2 years (1993-94)
Former Principal & Professor of Computer Science & Engg., SJCE.,  Mysore

Professional recognition
Visiting Professor at INRIA, Paris, France (1979)
Curriculum Vita included in “ Who is Who” prepared by  Classification Research, Germany
Chaired IECON Conference In Tokyo, Japan (Oct, 1984)
Charied a Conference In Zurich (Aug. 1986)
Chaired a Conference In Paris (1995)                                      
Invited to KESDA’98 Conference, Luxembourg (1998)
Invited Talk in the ECML Conference, Pisa, Italy (2004)
Fellow of  Institution of Engineers, India                                         
AICTE Expert ( Emeritus Professor Selection, Project Review/Selection)
ISTE Visiting Professor (1992-93)

Awards
In 1986 Prof. Chidananda Gowda was awarded the Kannada Sahitya Akademi award for his book, Putaanigala Vignyana Padyagalu. 
In 1995 he was given the M. Visveswaraya Technical Award for his contributions to engineering.
In 2019 he received the Rajyotsava award.

References

Educators from Karnataka
1942 births
Living people
People from Dakshina Kannada district
Bangalore University alumni
Maharaja Sayajirao University of Baroda alumni
Indian Institute of Science alumni
Engineers from Karnataka
Indian male poets
Poets from Karnataka
20th-century Indian engineers
Recipients of the Rajyotsava Award 2019